Mustafa Bešić (born March 12, 1961) is a former Slovenian ice hockey player of Bosnian origin. He played for the Yugoslavia men's national ice hockey team at the 1984 Winter Olympics in Sarajevo. He played almost his entire career in the Italian league.

References

1961 births
Living people
People from Sanski Most
HK Acroni Jesenice players
Ice hockey players at the 1984 Winter Olympics
Olympic ice hockey players of Yugoslavia
Bosniaks of Bosnia and Herzegovina
Slovenian people of Bosniak descent
Slovenian people of Bosnia and Herzegovina descent
Slovenian ice hockey centres
Yugoslav ice hockey centres
Yugoslav expatriate sportspeople in Italy
Yugoslav expatriate ice hockey people
Slovenian expatriate sportspeople in Italy
Slovenian expatriate ice hockey people
Expatriate ice hockey players in Italy